Peter Russell Weir (born 18 January 1958) is a Scottish former footballer, best known for his time with Aberdeen, who played as a winger.

Playing career
Having been a supporter of Aberdeen as a boy, Peter joined the club from St Mirren in 1981 for £300,000 plus Ian Scanlon, which was then a club record; Alex McLeish, who had attended Barrhead High School and played in youth teams alongside Weir, was already at the club. He had been brought to St Mirren in 1978 by Alex Ferguson who left the Paisley club within days, but soon became manager of Aberdeen and sought to make his former signing part of his new team.

Weir made 237 appearances and scored 38 goals whilst at Pittodrie, and was capped by Scotland on six occasions. He won two League titles and three Scottish Cups, as well as the European Cup Winners' Cup in 1983, playing a crucial role in the final.

In December 1987, Weir left the Dons to move across the border to sign for Leicester City for £80,000. Upon leaving Leicester in 1989, he returned to St Mirren and later played for Ayr United.

Coaching career
Weir later returned to Aberdeen in its youth system set-up.

In November 2018, he was one of four inductees into the club's Hall of Fame.

Honours
Aberdeen
Scottish Premier Division: 1983–84, 1984–85
Scottish Cup: 1981–82, 1982–83, 1983–84, 1985–86
Scottish League Cup: 1985–86
UEFA Cup Winners' Cup: 1982–83
UEFA Super Cup: 1983

References

External links
 

1958 births
Living people
Scottish footballers
People from Johnstone
Neilston Juniors F.C. players
Aberdeen F.C. players
Ayr United F.C. players
Leicester City F.C. players
St Mirren F.C. players
Scottish Junior Football Association players
Scottish Football League players
English Football League players
Scotland international footballers
Greenock Morton F.C. non-playing staff
Aberdeen F.C. non-playing staff
Association football wingers
Footballers from Renfrewshire